Bihor is a geographical region in northeastern Montenegro. Bihor is situated nearby to Jagoče, and northeast of Lopare. The region is within three municipalities: Berane, Bijelo Polje, and Petnjica. It was named after Bihor, a former medieval town that was near Bijelo Polje. The region mainly consists of ethnic Bosniaks.

Upper Bihor is located in southwestern Sandžak in northeastern Montenegro. It has an area of about 143 km2. The region has an elevation of 922 metres (3,025 feet).

Geology 
Upper Bihor has a variety of types of terrain. There are high mountains, river valleys, glacial and karst relief and volcanic mountains.

History 
In 1455, the Ottomans captured the city of Bihor. The town developed in the 16th century as the center of a kadiluk, with a garrison holding eight timars in 1530.

In 1878, Bihor became part of Montenegro. After the Balkan Wars and the fall of the Ottoman Empire, heavy pressure leads to the Muslims from Bihor moving to Bosnia and Herzegovina, Kosovo and Turkey. In 1914, a few thousand people from Bihor moved to Turkey, while the Eastern Orthodoxy followers begin moving in from various parts of Montenegro.

During the Second World War, Chetnik forces based in Montenegro conducted a series of ethnic cleansing operations against Muslims in the Bihor region. In May 1943, an estimated 5400 Albanian men, women and children in Bihor were massacred by Chetnik forces under Pavle Đurišić. The notables of the region then published a memorandum and declared themselves to be Albanians. The memorandum was sent to Prime Minister Ekrem Libohova whom they asked to intervene so the region could be united to the Albanian kingdom.

In the late 1940s, people from Bihor began moving to Vojvodina as colonists. Because of hard life in their new home, some people came back to Bihor. The migration of Muslims from this area to Turkey was intensive between 1956 and 1958. Today, the population is predominantly made up of Muslim Bosniaks with a minority of Serbian Orthodox followers.

Families 
There are 73 surnames of villagers found in Upper Bihor: 

Adrović  
Agović
Alibašić
Babić
Babačić
Batilović
Bibuljica
Bošnjak
Brakočević
Cikotić
Ćeman
Ćorović      
Čivović
Čilović
Čolović
Duraković
Đukić
Đurašković
Garčević
Goljo
Hajdarpašić
Halilović
Hodžić
Huremović
Idrizović
Ivezić
Javorovac
Kalić
Kočan
Korać
Klica
Kolić
Kožar
Kršić
Hećo
Herović
Latić
Levaić
Ličina
Ligonja
Luković
Mehović
Muhović
Mustajbašić
Muratović
Murić 
Mirković
Novalić
Osmanović
Palamar
Pačariz
Petrović
Pramenko
Prentić
Pljakić
Radošević
Ramdedović
Ramčilović
Račić
Rastoder
Rujović
Rugovac
Sijarić
Sadiković
Sehratlić
Smailović
Skenderović
Šabotić
Škrijelj
Taraniš
Tiganj
Vukajlović
Vujošević
Zverotić

Towns 

Azanje
Bare
Bistrica
Bor
Crnče
Dašča Rijeka
Dobrodole
Donja Vrbica
Donje Korito
Donji Ponor
Godočelje
Goduša
Gornja Vrbica
Hazane
Jahova Voda
Javorova
Johovice
Kalica
Kruščica
Lagatore
Laze
Lješnica
Murovac
Orahovo
Paljuh
Petnjica
Ponor
Poroče
Radmanci
Sipovice
Savin Bor
Sipanje
Trnavice
Trpezi
Tucanje
Vorbica
Vrševo

References

External links
About Bihor

Regions of Montenegro